Jhooti is a 2020 Pakistani television series started airing on ARY Digital from 1 February 2020. Iqra Aziz has played a leading role with her real life husband Yasir Hussain who played the main antagonist in the show. Directed By Syed Ramish Rizvi. Jhooti revolves around Nirma who has habit of lying in order to get whatever she wants. She lies with conviction and never gets caught.

Cast 

 Iqra Aziz as Nirma
 Ahmed Ali Butt as Nasir, Nirma's ex husband 
 Asma Abbas as Azra, Nirma's mother
 Madiha Rizvi as Zubia, Ahmed's wife
 Yasir Hussain as Ali, Nirma's new husband
 Paras Masroor as Ahmed, Nirma's brother 
 Tauqeer Nasir as Akbar, Nirma's father
 Qasim Khan as Majid, Nirma's brother 
 Mariyam Nafees as Saman, Majid's wife 
 Shaista Jabeen as Zubeida, Nasir's mother 
 Nida Hussain as Zara, Ali's ex-friend
 Zahid Qureshi as Manzoor, Nasir's father
 Syeda Iman Zaidi as Sameen, Nirma's Bestfriend
 Syed Saim Ali as Hashim, Ali's friend

Soundtrack

The OST is sung and composed by Sajjad Ali on his own lyrics. The music for the series is given by Shabi.

Reception 
The first episode of Jhooti got more than 10.3 million views on YouTube as of January 2022.

Accolades

References 

2020 Pakistani television series debuts
Urdu-language television shows
ARY Digital original programming
Pakistani television series
2020s Pakistani television series